Eastern Parkway is a parkway in Brooklyn, New York.

Eastern Parkway may also refer to:
 Eastern Parkway (Louisville, Kentucky)
 Subway infrastructure on Eastern Parkway in Brooklyn, New York:
 Eastern Parkway (BMT Fulton Street Line)
 Eastern Parkway (BMT Jamaica Line)
 Eastern Parkway–Brooklyn Museum (IRT Eastern Parkway Line)
 IRT Eastern Parkway Line
 Eastern Parkway, an Anniston bypass of Alabama State Route 202
 Eastern Parkway, an extension of the Monaro Highway in Canberra, Australia

See also
 Boxing from Eastern Parkway
 Charles River Reservation Parkways in Boston's Charles River Reservation